Oyster Bay is an inlet in southern Puget Sound which branches off from Totten Inlet. The bay spans Mason and Thurston counties, in the U.S. state of Washington.  Kennedy Creek empties into the bay at the U.S. Highway 101 overpass.

Oyster Bay was named for the oyster industry it supports. The bay is the site of one of only four oyster reserves in Puget Sound where the Olympia oyster grows. Oyster Bay is one of the most productive chum salmon runs in the state with over 40,000 spawners a year, estimated to be two-thirds of the run that would exist without human impacts.

References

 Findlay, Jean Cammon, and Paterson, Robin, Mosquito Fleet of South Puget Sound, Arcadia Publishing (2008) .

Geography of Mason County, Washington
Geography of Thurston County, Washington